Ukrtatnafta is a Ukrainian oil refining company based in Kremenchuk and founded in 1994. It is one of the largest producer of oil products in the country. Ukrainian state-owned energy company Naftohaz Ukrainy owns 43.1% of shares in Ukrtatnafta, Tatneft owns 8.6% and the government of Tatarstan owns 28.8%.

Controversy
Russian oil company Tatneft has an ongoing dispute with the government of Ukraine over control in Ukrtatnafta.  18% of the shares were transferred to two offshore companies allied with Tatneft, a transaction which was not recognized by Ukrainian authorities. According to the court decision, these share were handed over to Naftogaz and in October 2007, there was a management change, which is not recognized by Tatneft. In March Tatneft filed international arbitration against Ukraine.

In Autumn 2022, whilst under the control of Ihor Kolomoiskyi, Ukrtatnafta refused to pay UAH 3.2 billion in taxes.

Seizure by Ukrainian government 
On November 6th, 2022 the government headed by President Volodymyr Zelenskiy used martial law to seize control of the company. “Such steps, which are necessary for our country in conditions of war, are carried out in accordance with current laws and will help meet the urgent needs of our defense sector.” The government of Ukraine also took control of engine maker Motor Sich, energy company Ukrnafta, vehicle maker AvtoKrAZ and transformer maker Zaporizhtransformator at the same time.

Ihor Kolomoiskyi and Gennadiy Bogolyubov owned 60% of the shares in Ukrtatnafta. These shares will be transferred to a special depository account managed by the Ministry of Defense of Ukraine.

Suspected criminal activity 
On 1 February 2023 the Economic Security Bureau of Ukraine announced that it had exposed an alleged $1 billion embezzlement scheme affecting Ukrtatnafta and Ukrnafta. 

The misappropriated UAH40 billion is claimed to involve the former management of Ukrnafta and Ukrtatnafta. The illegal schemes involved tax evasion and money laundering.

Further charges have been made against the senior management and chief accountant in relation to non payment of excise tax on sales of fuel, amounting to UAH 605 million.

References 

Oil companies of Ukraine
Oil refineries in Ukraine
Energy companies established in 1995
Kremenchuk
Economy of Poltava Oblast
Buildings and structures in Poltava Oblast